Kerry Rattray (born 13 July 1944) is a former Australian rules footballer who played with Melbourne in the Victorian Football League (VFL).

Notes

External links 		

		
		
		
		
1944 births
Living people
Australian rules footballers from Tasmania		
Melbourne Football Club players
Penguin Football Club players